Begonia salaziensis is a species of plant in the family Begoniaceae. It is endemic to Mauritius.  Its natural habitat is subtropical or tropical dry forests.

References

salaziensis
Critically endangered plants
Endemic flora of Mauritius
Taxonomy articles created by Polbot